Friederike Sieburg (1761–1835) was a German pastellist.

Sieburg was born in Berlin. Daniel Chodowiecki encouraged her to show her work, and she exhibited pastel portraits at the academy in Berlin in 1788, 1793, and 1794. Her sister Philippine was also a painter.

References

1761 births
1835 deaths
German women painters
18th-century German painters
18th-century German women artists
Pastel artists
Artists from Berlin